Hybos is a genus of hybotid flies.

Species

H. biancistroides Yang & Li, 2011
H. coniatus Melander, 1928
H. crassatus Saigusa & Yang, 2003
H. culiciformis (Fabricius, 1775)
H. femoratus (Müller, 1776)
H. grossipes (Linnaeus, 1767)

References

Hybotidae
Articles containing video clips
Empidoidea genera
Taxa named by Johann Wilhelm Meigen